Nicolás Xiviller (born 11 November 1998) is an Uruguayan tennis player.

Xiviller has a career high ATP singles ranking of 1308 achieved on 19 June 2017. He also has a career high ATP doubles ranking of 1020 achieved on 10 October 2016.

Xiviller represents Uruguay at the Davis Cup where he has a W/L record of 3–0.

External links

1998 births
Living people
Uruguayan people of Catalan descent
Uruguayan male tennis players